This is a list of countries by population based on the country population estimates published by the UN, counting Greenland, which is a part of North America. The largest country by land area is Canada, and by population is the United States. The largest city by population is Mexico City. The languages most spoken are English, Spanish and French.

See also 
 List of North American countries by area
 List of North American countries by life expectancy

References

Lists of countries by continent
Countries in North America
Demographics of North America
North America
North America
North America
North America-related lists
Countries
North America